Eduardo Antonio Leon (born August 11, 1946) is a former Major League Baseball infielder of Mexican American descent, who played for eight seasons, splitting time as a shortstop and second baseman. He played for the Cleveland Indians from 1968 to 1972, the Chicago White Sox in 1973 and 1974, and the New York Yankees in 1975 until being released on May 5 of that year. He had been traded from the White Sox to the Yankees for Cecil Upshaw at the Winter Meetings on December 5, 1974.

In 601 games over eight seasons, Leon posted a .236 batting average (440-for-1862) with 165 runs, 24 home runs, 159 RBI and 156 bases on balls. Defensively, he recorded an overall .974 fielding percentage playing at second base and shortstop.

References

External links
, or Retrosheet, or Pura Pelota (Venezuelan Winter League)

1946 births
Living people
Alijadores de Tampico players
All-American college baseball players
American baseball players of Mexican descent
American expatriate baseball players in Mexico
Arizona Wildcats baseball players
Baseball players from Tucson, Arizona
Chicago White Sox players
Cleveland Indians players
Major League Baseball second basemen
Major League Baseball shortstops
Navegantes del Magallanes players
American expatriate baseball players in Venezuela
New York Yankees players
Pawtucket Indians players
Portland Beavers players
Tucson High School alumni
Alaska Goldpanners of Fairbanks players